Galerina steglichii is a mushroom species described by Besl in 1993 and named after Wolfgang Steglich.

Galerina steglichii is part of the genus Galerina and family Strophariaceae. It has no subspecies.

Chemistry
The mushroom contains psilocybin.

References

Psychoactive fungi
Psychedelic tryptamine carriers
Hymenogastraceae